Senator Simmons may refer to:

David H. Simmons (born 1952), Florida State Senate
Derrick Simmons (born 1976), Mississippi State Senate
Furnifold McLendel Simmons (1854–1940), U.S. Senator from North Carolina from 1901 to 1931
James F. Simmons (1795–1864), U.S. Senator from Rhode Island from 1841 to 1847 and from 1857 to 1862
Thomas J. Simmons (1837–1905), Georgia State Senate